Ursuline Academy is a private, Catholic, all-girls high school and elementary school (Toddler 2 through 12th grade) in New Orleans, Louisiana, United States.  It is located within the Archdiocese of New Orleans and under the trusteeship of the Ursuline Sisters of the New Orleans Community, part of the Ursuline Central Province of North America. Founded in 1727, the Academy is the oldest Catholic school and the oldest school for women in the United States.

History 
The Ursuline Academy was founded in 1727 by the Sisters of the Order of Saint Ursula, in New Orleans. It is the oldest continuously-operating school for girls, and the oldest Catholic school in the United States.

The Academy included the first convent, the first free school, and the first retreat center for ladies.  It offered the first classes for female African-American slaves, free women of color, and Native Americans.

Academics
An Ursuline education is based on the philosophy of Saint Angela Merici.

Traditions 

Rally began in 1948 as a way for classes to show their school spirit in the areas of volleyball intramurals, through skits, posters, songs, and cheers. Each class was given a name (Skip, Mac, Leprechaun or Sioux (now Phoenix)) to replace existing sororities on campus and carried them until they graduated and passed them on to a little sister class.

Athletics
Ursuline Academy athletics competes in the LHSAA.

Notable alumnae

 Lurita Doan, administrator of the U.S. General Services Administration
 Mary Landrieu, US Senator

See also
 History of the Ursulines in New Orleans

References

Notes

External links
 School website
 

African-American history in New Orleans
African-American Roman Catholicism
Catholic secondary schools in New Orleans
Catholic elementary schools in Louisiana
Private K-12 schools in New Orleans
Girls' schools in Louisiana
History of women in Louisiana
Ursuline schools
18th century in New Orleans
Educational institutions established in 1727
1727 establishments in New France